Prantik Nawrose Nabil (born 13 November 2003) is a Bangladeshi cricketer. He made his List A debut for Bangladesh Krira Shikkha Protishtan in the 2018–19 Dhaka Premier Division Cricket League on 23 March 2019. In December 2019, he was named in Bangladesh's squad for the 2020 Under-19 Cricket World Cup. In December 2021, he was named as the vice-captain of Bangladesh's team for the 2022 ICC Under-19 Cricket World Cup in the West Indies. He made his first-class debut on 10 October 2022, for Khulna Division in the 2022–23 National Cricket League.

References

External links
 

2003 births
Living people
Bangladeshi cricketers
Bangladesh Krira Shikkha Protishtan cricketers
Khulna Division cricketers
Place of birth missing (living people)